Issah Abdul Basit  (born 7 May 2002) is a Ghanaian footballer who currently plays as a forward for Ghana Premier League side WAFA.

Career 
Basit started his career with West African Football Academy, he was promoted to the senior team in March 2021 ahead of the second round of the 2020–21 Ghana Premier League season. On 4 April 2021, he made his debut in a goalless draw against King Faisal Babes. He scored his debut goal on 25 April 2021 by scoring an overhead kick in a 1–0 win against Techiman Eleven Wonders. The following match against Berekum Chelsea on 30 April, he scored the winning goal in a thrilling 3–2 home victory to score on two consecutive occasions. He was adjudged the man of the match for his performance in both matches. At the end of April, he was adjudged the NASCO player of the month, beating Berekum Chelsea's Stephen Amankonah, Aduana Stars' Benjamin Tweneboah and Hans Kwofie of Legon Cities.

References

External links 
 

Living people
2002 births
Association football forwards
West African Football Academy players
Ghana Premier League players
Ghanaian footballers